Jennie-O Turkey Store is a brand name of turkey products. It is a subsidiary of the Hormel Foods Corporation in Willmar, Minnesota.

History
The company was founded by Earl B. Olson in 1940, when he began raising turkeys.  In 1949, he bought the former Farmers Produce Company of Willmar and its turkey processing plant. In 1953, it was renamed to Jennie-O after his daughter, Jennifer Olson.

Wallace Jerome also played a role in the formation of the current Jennie-O organization. In 1941 Jerome founded the Turkey Store Company.

The company was privately owned by the Olson family until 1986, when it was sold to Hormel Foods, of Austin, Minnesota. In February 2001, Jennie-O Foods, Inc., and The Turkey Store Company, consolidated under Hormel to create the brand Jennie-O Turkey Store.

Locations
Jennie-O has a total of six company locations, five of which are in Minnesota and one in Wisconsin. The Minnesota locations include Willmar/Spicer, Faribault, Montevideo, Pelican Rapids, and Melrose.  The only Wisconsin plant is found in Barron.

References

Brand name meats
Hormel Foods brands